is a 2005 Japanese drama broadcast by TV Asahi based on a novel by Yasutaka Tsutsui.

Synopsis
Miwako Kanbe, the granddaughter of a millionaire, becomes a detective and starts working at a police station where there are few women. Her style, elegant manners, and upper-class attitudes constantly get on the nerves of her old-fashioned co-workers. However, Miwako’s investigations solve many cases.

Cast
Kyoko Fukada as Miwako Kanbe
Kazuma Suzuki as Tetsuya Saruwatari
Ryuji Sainei as Seiichi Nishijima
Shinji Yamashita as Kumanari Kamakura
Takeshi Masu as Yoshikazu Tsuruoka
Kazuyuki Aijima as Torahiko Kouzuka
Susumu Terajima as Koushirou Nunobiki
Tokuma Nishioka as Ikuzo Kamiyama
Isao Natsuyagi as Kikuemon Kanbe
Yoshie Ichige as Matsue Suzuki
Yasutaka Tsutsui as Ryuhei Sezaki
Anna Nose as Sezaki's secretary
Maho Nonami as Junko Higuchi
Megumi Nakayama as Hiromi 
Shigeru Matsuzaki
Youichi Nukumizu (cameo)
Mitsuhiro Oikawa (ep10)
Yuki Matsumura

Episodes
Ep 01: 
Ep 02: 
Ep 03: 
Ep 04: 
Ep 05: 
Ep 06: 
Ep 07: 
Ep 08: 
Ep 09: 
Ep 10:

Ratings
Ep 01: 16.2%
Ep 02: 11.1%
Ep 03: 12.6%
Ep 04: 12.6%
Ep 05: 13.2%
Ep 06: 11.6%
Ep 07: 10.6%
Ep 08: 12.3%
Ep 09: 11.7%
Ep 10: 12.3%

External links
 

Mystery television series
TV Asahi television dramas
2005 Japanese television series debuts
2005 Japanese television series endings
Japanese drama television series
Television shows based on Japanese novels